Gerhard Hausner (born 25 September 1947) is an Austrian ice hockey player. He competed in the men's tournaments at the 1968 Winter Olympics and the 1976 Winter Olympics.

References

External links
 

1947 births
Living people
20th-century Austrian people
Austrian ice hockey players
Ice hockey people from Vienna
Ice hockey players at the 1968 Winter Olympics
Ice hockey players at the 1976 Winter Olympics
Olympic ice hockey players of Austria